was a Japanese magazine of the early 20th century, published by the Hakubunkan publishing company. It featured stories and photos about the Russo-Japanese War of 1905. Shunrō Oshikawa was its lead reporter. The magazine ceased publication in 1907.

References

1907 disestablishments in Japan
Defunct magazines published in Japan
Magazines published in Tokyo
History magazines
Magazines with year of establishment missing
Magazines disestablished in 1907